Middle Cascade Glacier is in Wenatchee National Forest in the U.S. state of Washington and is to the north of Spider Mountain and east of Mount Formidable. Middle Cascade Glacier has a significant icefall that is thinning and may eventually separate the upper section of the glacier from the lower. Middle Cascade Glacier retreated  between 1979 and 2005. The smaller Spider Glacier is just southeast of Middle Cascade Glacier.

See also
List of glaciers in the United States

References

Glaciers of the North Cascades
Glaciers of Skagit County, Washington
Glaciers of Washington (state)